Final Mission is a 2013 Bengali film. The film was directed by Sudipto Sengupta and produced by Calcutta Talkies. Music of the film had been composed by Hriju Roy Chowdhury. The film released on 1 March 2013.

Plot
The film starts with the murder of an honest industrialist, Jayabrata Chakraborty (Rajat Ganguly), as the result of a terrible plan made by three criminals - Ranabir Hazra (Shyamal Dutta), Binod Pandey (Shankar Chakraborty), and Manmohan Sawant (Raja Chattopadhyay). Formerly, Jayabrata was a close friend of Ranabir Hazra. Their relationship was strengthened by an unassailable companionship. Apart from that, Jayabrata’s wife (Irani Mukherjee) shared an extremely sympathetic relationship with Ranabir’s wife, Jui (Santana Bose). However, the harmony between the two families got spoiled as the greedy and cruel thoughts of Ranabir Hazra came to the forefront, with fumes of retaliation harboured by Jui against her own husband. Jui had thought of a deadly mission of avenging her husband. As a demonstration of her canny strategy, Jui deploys her own son, Rana (Ferdous Ahmed) along with Jayabrata’s son, Raja (Sanjay Banerjee) in the ferocious dynamic encounter against her own husband Ranabir. Emboldened by the momentum of Jui, Rana initiated the courageous campaign of exercising penal measures against the three conspirers - Ranabir, Binod and Manmohan.

Cast
 Ferdous Ahmed as Rana Hazra
 Shankar Chakraborty as Binod Pandey
 Rimjhim Mitra Sumana Pandey, daughter of Binod Pandey, Rana's love interest
 Raja Chattopadhyay as Manmohan Sawant
 Shyamal Dutta as Ranabir Hazra
 Santana Bose as Jui Hazra
 Rajat Ganguly as Jayabrata Chakraborty
 Irani Mukherjee as Malabika Chakraborty, wife of Jayabrata Chakraborty
 Sanjay Banerjee as Raja Chakraborty
 Bhola Tamang

Soundtrack

The soundtrack of Final Mission is composed by Hriju Roy Chowdhury. The film has 7 original songs which are sung by single singers as well as in duets. The soundtrack was released on 30 December 2012.

Track list

Critical reception

Final Mission received average reviews from critics. Even, the soundtrack was not well accepted. The acting of the cast was praised a lot. As a whole, director got nice compliments for his directorial debut.

Critics of  said - "Though Final Mission might seem to be the name of a 'war' film, it is neither a war film and is in fact a Bengali film. Well, it is a sort of a 'war' film, but not in the true sense. It is the war between different people and a war between members of the same family. Imagine a name like Final Mission being sort of a revenge tale."
"The film is about a businessman, Jayabrata Chakrabarty who is murdered by three conniving men Ranabir Hazra, Binod Pandey and Manmohan Sawant. Out of them, Jayabrata’s family is very close to Ranabir’s family as their wives are very close. The relationship is spoilt - thanks to Ranabir Hazra who destroys the happiness of Jayabrata’s family."

"This film is unique in the sense this is one story when one family turns one against another, in this case, a mother turns the father against son. The son is forced to hate the father from a young age and he in fact joins forces with Jayabrata’s son, Raja to teach his father a lesson. In due course of time, the other two are also taught a lesson. All this is possible due to Jui, Ranabir’s wife , the brains behind this plan. Sumana, Binod Pandey’s daughter, who is Rana’s ladylove also helps to carry out this plan."

"Well, Ferdous and Rimjhim Mitra certainly seem to be an odd pair, taking their age and chemistry in consideration. As usual, the character artists specially Santana Bose who plays Jui and Shankar Chakraborty, Raja Chattopadhyay and the rest make it watchable. Not much is expected from a film which stars Ferdaus and Rimjhim Mitra in the lead roles. The songs make it more boring."

See also
 Aborto

References

Bengali-language Indian films
2010s Bengali-language films
Indian thriller drama films